Iliescu is a Romanian surname:
 Adriana Iliescu (b. 1938), Romanian university lecturer and children's writer
 Aristide Iliescu (? – 1942), Romanian sculptor and painter
 Constantin C. Iliescu (1892 – 1978), Romanian physician
 Constantin I. Iliescu (? – ?), Romanian politician
 Dragoș Iliescu (born 1974), Romanian psychologist
 Ion Iliescu (b. 1930), President of Romania (1992–1996; 2000–2004)
 Juan Iliesco (1898 – 1968), Romanian-born Argentine chess player
 Mihai Iliescu (b. 1978), Romanian bobsledder
 Nicolae Iliescu (b. 1956), Romanian writer and opinion journalist
 Octavian Iliescu (1919 – 2009), Romanian numismatist
 Șerban Iliescu (1956 – 2016), Romanian linguist and journalist
 Valentin Adrian Iliescu (b. 1961), Romanian politician

See also 
 Dumitru Iliescu (disambiguation)

Romanian-language surnames
Patronymic surnames
Surnames from given names